Jack Feldman may refer to:

 Jack L. Feldman, American neuroscientist
 Jack M. Feldman, American psychologist
 Jack Feldman (songwriter), American lyricist

See also
 John Feldmann (born 1967), American musician and producer